Hekou is a town in Daozhen Gelao and Miao Autonomous County, Guizhou, China.

Administrative division
As of 2016, the town is divided into seven villages: 
 Shiqiao
 Xingmin
 Chetian
 Meijiang
 Datian
 Saba
 Zhulintang

History
On January 14, 2016, it was upgraded to a town.

Economy
The economy of the town is supported primarily by farming and ranching.

References

Bibliography

Towns of Zunyi